Not to Scale is the first album by folk band Kerfuffle.

Track listing

(All tracks arranged by Kerfuffle)

Personnel
Sam Sweeney (fiddle, percussion)
Hannah James (Accordion, piano, vocals, clogging)
Chris Thornton-Smith (Guitar)
Tom Sweeney (Bass guitar)

2003 albums
Kerfuffle albums